Trypanaresta delicatella is a species of tephritid or fruit flies in the genus Trypanaresta of the family Tephritidae.

Distribution
Chile, Argentina.

References

Tephritinae
Insects described in 1854
Diptera of South America